Guerrero Gold Belt  is a region in Mexico with gold mineralization in the southern State of Guerrero that extends over 35 kilometers north of Acapulco.  Located in an area consisting of several multimillion ounce gold deposits related to Fe-Au skarns, the area is known for its historic small mining operations dating back to 1924.

Companies with interests in the area

Current 
Minaurum Gold Inc.
 Cayden Resources Inc.
Citation Resources Inc.
Newstrike Capital
Oroco Resource Corp. 
Torex Gold Resources Inc. (formerly Gleichen Resources Ltd)
Telson Mining Corporation

Past 
Aurea Mining Inc.
Goldcorp Inc.
Industrias Peñoles
Miranda Mining Corporation (formerly Minera Nukay)
Newmont Mining Corporation
Teck Resources (formerly Teck-Cominco Limited)

References

External links 
 Bullionvault - Mexican Geology
 Northern Miner - Enticing Guerrero Gold Belt Attracts Gold Juniors

Metallogenetic provinces
Geography of Guerrero